James Thomas Woodhouse, 1st Baron Terrington (16 July 1852 – 8 February 1921), known as Sir James Woodhouse, from 1895 to 1918, was an English Liberal Party politician.

Woodhouse was the son of James Woodhouse of Flamborough, Yorkshire. He served as the member of parliament (MP) for Huddersfield from 1895 to 1906, and was also a Railway and Canal Traffic Commissioner from 1906 to 1921 and Chairman of the Losses under Defence of the Realm Commission from 1915 to 1921. He was knighted in 1895, and on 19 January 1918 he was raised to the peerage as Baron Terrington, of Huddersfield in the County of York.

Lord Terrington married Jessie, daughter of Walter James Reed, in 1876. They had two children: Harold and Horace. Lord Terrington died in February 1921, aged 68, and was succeeded in his titles by his eldest son Harold. Lady Terrington died in 1942.

Arms

References

Kidd, Charles, Williamson, David (editors). Debrett's Peerage and Baronetage (1990 edition). New York: St Martin's Press, 1990,

External links 
 

1852 births
1921 deaths
Barons in the Peerage of the United Kingdom
People from Flamborough
Woodhouse, James
Woodhouse, James
UK MPs who were granted peerages
Woodhouse, James
Barons created by George V